Aditya Roy Kapur (born 16 November 1985) is an Indian actor who works predominantly in Hindi films. He made his acting debut in 2009 with the musical drama film London Dreams. Kapur had his first commercial success came with the romantic musical Aashiqui 2 in 2013 for which he received critical acclaim and won several awards including BIG Star Entertainment Awards for Best Actor in a Romantic Role.

In the same year, he starred in the coming-of-age romantic comedy-drama Yeh Jawaani Hai Deewani for which he won the IIFA Award for Best Supporting Actor and a nomination for the Filmfare Award for Best Supporting Actor. Following a career downturn, with critical and commercial failures such as Daawat-e-Ishq (2014), Fitoor (2016), Ok Jaanu (2017) and Kalank (2019), he later gained praise for the action thriller Malang (2020) and the black comedy Ludo (2020).

Early life
Kapur was born in Mumbai on 16 November 1985 to a Punjabi Hindu father, Kumud Roy Kapur, and a Jewish mother Salome Aaron. His grandfather, Raghupat Roy Kapur, was a film producer in the early 1940s. Kapur is the youngest of the three siblings; his eldest brother, Siddharth Roy Kapur, was the chief executive officer of UTV Motion Pictures and is married to the actress, Vidya Balan. His second elder brother, Kunaal Roy Kapur, is also an actor.

His maternal grandparents, Sam and Ruby Aaron, were qualified dance teachers who introduced the Sama dance to India. He did his schooling from G. D. Somani Memorial School, in Cuffe Parade, Mumbai, where all his siblings studied and his mother directed school plays.

Kapur enrolled in St. Xavier's in Class XI, but failed. He had to enroll in St. Andrew's College to avoid losing a year. Subsequently, he graduated from St. Xavier's College, affiliated to the University of Mumbai. During his school years, he wanted to be a cricketer but he quit cricket coaching classes after sixth standard.

Career

Early work (2004–2012) 

Kapur was initially a VJ on the music channel Channel V India, where his comic timing and "unique style of hosting" was appreciated. He starred in a show titled Pakao and also hosted the popular show, India's Hottest with VJ Bruna Abdullah till 2008.

Kapur made his Hindi film debut with a supporting role in the 2009 musical drama London Dreams starring Salman Khan, Ajay Devgn and Asin Thottumkal. The series of supporting roles continued with his two films released in 2010–the Akshay Kumar-starrer Action Replayy and the Hrithik Roshan-starrer Guzaarish. However, none of these films performed well at the box office but made Kapur a prominent actor .

Breakthrough and career fluctuations (2013–2019) 

In 2013, Kapur found his breakthrough role as Rahul Jaykar in the romantic musical Aashiqui 2 co-starring Shraddha Kapoor. Premiering on 26 April 2013, Aashiqui 2 emerged as a commercial success at the box-office and was one of the highest-grossing Bollywood films of 2013, earning  worldwide within the first four weeks. Taran Adarsh of Bollywood Hungama praised his performance, writing that "...Aditya Roy Kapur's depiction of the intense character is outstanding... [which] clearly demonstrates his potency as an artist of caliber and competence." Hindustan Times critic Anupama Chopra noted that Kapur "gives Rahul's angst a certain charm... He is earnest and broken." That year, Kapur played the supporting role of Avinash Arora in the film Yeh Jawaani Hai Deewani which not only became one of the highest grossing Indian films but also the highest grossing film of his career.

In 2014, he played Tariq Haider in the romantic comedy film Daawat-e-Ishq alongside Parineeti Chopra. The film released to average reviews by critics, and was financially unsuccessful.  In 2016, Kapur starred as Noor Nizami in the romantic drama film Fitoor alongside Katrina Kaif and Tabu based on Charles Dickens' 1861 novel Great Expectations. He also made cameo appearances in films Dear Zindagi and Welcome To New York. In 2016, he was a part of the celebrity music tour Dream Team Bollywood and performed in San Jose, Los Angeles, Chicago, New York with Karan Johar, Varun Dhawan, Sidharth Malhotra, Katrina Kaif, Parineeti Chopra, Alia Bhatt and Badshah.

In 2017, Kapur starred as Aditya Gunjal in the romantic drama film Ok Jaanu alongside Shraddha Kapoor which received mixed reviews from critics Bollywood Hungama stating that it is "a decent love story which works only in parts mainly because of the chemistry between Aditya Roy Kapur and Shraddha Kapoor." In 2019, he starred as Dev Chaudhry in the romantic drama film Kalank alongside Alia Bhatt, Varun Dhawan and Sonakshi Sinha. The film received mixed reviews upon release, with criticism towards its direction, storyline and length, but praise for its music, visuals and performances of the ensemble cast. Nonetheless, it was unsuccessful at the box office.

Praise through Malang and beyond (2020–present) 

In 2019, Kapur starred as Adavit Thakur in the romantic action thriller Malang alongside Disha Patani. Kapur's performance got positive reviews from critics. Harshada Rege of The Times of India wrote, "Aditya impresses in the role of a guy whose life goes through a major upheaval. He shows restraint and finesses in his performance. The actor's physical transformation adds weight to all the kicks and punches he pulls in the film." Bollywood Hungama called his performance as "very convincing as a fearless man with a vengeance who can take on dozens of goons. Malang earned  worldwide thus becoming a commercial success. 

In 2020, he starred as Vishal Agnihotri in the action thriller road film Sadak 2 alongside Sanjay Dutt and Alia Bhatt, which released on 28 August 2020 on the streaming platform Disney+ Hotstar. The film was universally panned by critics, with criticism for its performance, script, dialogues and use of clichés. Anupama Chopra of Film Companion wrote, "The storytelling, performances dialogue, cinematography, songs, background music – all seem to belong to the 90's". The same year he starred in the black comedy crime film Ludo as Aakash Chauhan alongside Sanya Malhotra which released on 12 November 2020 in Netflix and receiving positive reviews with praise towards its screenplay, cinematography, music, direction and performances of the cast. Nairita Mukherjee from India Today reviewed the movie positively, calling it 'naram-garam and delicious' which is "out-of-the-box while staying firmly in the box."

Kapur and Sanjana Sanghi began shooting for the action thriller film Rashtra Kavach Om in December 2020. It released theatrically on 1 July 2022 with received negative response from critics towards the storyline eventually became Box office bomb. Nairita Mukherjee of India Today wrote "Aditya Roy Kapur's glistening biceps, though impressive, may not be strong enough to hold the weight of this strictly average actioner".

Upcoming project 

Kapur will next star alongside Mrunal Thakur in the crime thriller Gumraah, the Hindi remake of the 2019 Tamil film Thadam.

In the media 

Kapur is frequently featured in the Times of India's Most Desirable Men list rank at No 28 in 2018 No 11 in 2019 and No 3 in 2020.

Filmography

Films

Web series

Awards and nominations

See also 

 List of Indian film actors

References

External links 

 
 
 
 

1985 births
Male actors in Hindi cinema
Living people
Male actors from Mumbai
St. Xavier's College, Mumbai alumni
Indian VJs (media personalities)
21st-century Indian male actors
Punjabi Hindus
Indian Jews
Indian male actors
Screen Awards winners
International Indian Film Academy Awards winners
University of Mumbai alumni